The Ireland women's cricket team toured Pakistan in November 2022 to play three Women's One Day Internationals (WODIs) and three Women's Twenty20 Internationals (WT20Is). All of the matches were played at the Gaddafi Stadium in Lahore. The WODI matches formed part of the 2022–2025 ICC Women's Championship. This was the first time that a senior Ireland national team has played a series in Pakistan. Going into the series, Pakistan held a record of 12 wins from 18 WODI matches against Ireland, and the last time the two sides met in the format was in February 2017.

Pakistan won the first match of the ODI series by 128 runs on the back of a record 221-run opening partnership by Sidra Ameen and Muneeba Ali. The hosts also won the second match, this time by a margin of 9 wickets, with Sidra Ameen scoring an unbeaten 91. Ireland put up an improved performance in the third ODI, but a five-wicket haul by Ghulam Fatima led Pakistan to a 5-wicket victory and a 3–0 series sweep. Sidra Ameen was named player of the series.

Ireland won the first T20I by six wickets. Pakistan levelled the series after winning the second T20I, which had been reduced to 17 overs per side due to rain. Ireland won the decisive third T20I to claim an historic 2–1 series victory. This was the first series win for Ireland women against Pakistan and their first series win away against any Test-playing nation. Gaby Lewis was named player of the series.

Squads

Pakistan named Tuba Hassan and Ayesha Naseem as reserves for their ODI squad, along with Ghulam Fatima, Sidra Nawaz and Umm-e-Hani for their T20I squad. Before the start of the series, Tuba Hassan was ruled out of Pakistan's T20I squad due to a finger injury.

WODI series

1st WODI

2nd WODI

3rd WODI

WT20I series

1st WT20I

2nd WT20I

3rd WT20I

References

External links
 Series home at ESPNcricinfo

Pakistan 2022-23
2022 in Pakistani cricket
2022 in Irish cricket
International cricket competitions in 2022–23
Ireland 2022-23
Women's international cricket tours of Pakistan